Vaijnath Shinde is an Indian politician from the Indian National Congress and currently a Member of Legislative Assembly (MLA) in the Maharashtra. In 2009, he contested election from the Latur Rural and defeated Ramesh Karad of Bharatiya Janata Party & Independent Dilip Nade by over 23583 votes.

References

Living people
People from Latur
Indian National Congress politicians
1969 births
People from Osmanabad district
Maharashtra MLAs 2009–2014
People from Marathwada
Marathi politicians
Indian National Congress politicians from Maharashtra